Chris Jenkins is an American sound engineer. He has won three Academy Awards for Best Sound and was nominated for two others in the same category. He has worked on more than 150 films since 1979.

Selected filmography
Jenkins has won three Academy Awards for Best Sound and was nominated for another two:

Won
 Out of Africa (1985)
 The Last of the Mohicans (1992)
 Mad Max: Fury Road (2015) (with Ben Osmo and Gregg Rudloff)

Nominated
 Dick Tracy (1990)
 Wanted (2008)

References

External links

Year of birth missing (living people)
Living people
American audio engineers
Best Sound Mixing Academy Award winners
Best Sound BAFTA Award winners
Emmy Award winners